Tachypleus tridentatus, commonly known as the Chinese horseshoe crab, Japanese horseshoe crab, or tri-spine horseshoe crab, is a species of horseshoe crab found in Southeast and East Asia, with records from China, Indonesia, Japan, South Korea, Malaysia, the Philippines, Taiwan, and Vietnam.

Description

Horseshoe crabs are not crabs at all, but are most closely related to spiders and scorpions, and may even be arachnids themselves. The cephalothorax is protected by this single large, horseshoe-shaped plate, and neither it nor the abdomen is visibly segmented. The tail bears a long spike, known as the telson. Like other horseshoe crabs, the carapace of T. tridentatus consists of a larger frontal one (the prosoma) and a smaller, spine-edged rear one (the opisthosoma). There are six pairs of prosomal appendages/legs, consisting of a small frontal pair in front of the mouth and five larger walking/pushing legs on either side of the mouth. The book gills are located on the underside of the opisthosoma. Both the common name tri-spine horseshoe crab and the scientific name tridentatus refer to the three small spiny processes on the rear part of the opisthosoma (one spine in the middle above the tail and one on either side), while other species only have a single spine (in the middle).

The tri-spine horseshoe crab is the largest of the living horseshoe crab species. Like the other species, females grow larger than males. There are significant geographic variations in the size, but this does not follow a clear north–south or east–west pattern. Females weigh  and males . In addition to the difference in size, males' two front pairs of walking legs, prosomal appendages two and three,  have hooks (they are scissor-like in females) and they have six (three in females) long spines on either side of the rear carapace. Juveniles (both sexes) also have six long spines on either side, similar to adult males. From the eggs hatch to adulthood takes 4 years and involves 15 instar phases (14 moults).

Ecology

Like other species of horseshoe crabs, T. tridentatus is an omnivore and feeds on molluscs, worms, other benthic invertebrates and algae. Large batches of eggs are laid in holes dug in sandy beaches in special nursery areas off the coast. On hatching, the larvae remain in the nest over winter, feeding on the yolks of their eggs for several months, remaining in this nursery area during the next spring and summer. As juveniles they remain buried in the sediment during high tide, emerging at low tide to feed on the exposed surface. They have limited opportunities to disperse widely. As a poikilotherm, this horseshoe crab is much affected by rising seawater temperatures, reacting by burying itself deeply in the sediment and sometimes going into diapause.

Status

The tri-spine horseshoe crab are at risk from over-fishing, pollution and the loss of their breeding grounds. Populations have declined for decades, and the species was granted protection in Japan in 1928. In China it has become less common and, from being once abundant in Taiwan, it is now seldom seen inshore there. As of 2019, the International Union for Conservation of Nature classifies the species as "Endangered" based on recent population and habitat declines.

References

External links

Xiphosura
Animals described in 1819
Arthropods of China
Arthropods of Indonesia
Chelicerates of Japan
Invertebrates of Malaysia
Arthropods of the Philippines
Invertebrates of Korea
Arthropods of Taiwan
Arthropods of Vietnam
Taxonomy articles created by Polbot